WTIJ-LP is a Religious and Southern Gospel formatted broadcast radio station licensed to and serving Bryson City, North Carolina.  WTIJ-LP is owned and operated by Grace Christian Academy.

History
WTIJ-LP, Swain County's first FM station, launched at 5:00 pm on November 27, 2015.  The station's studios are located at Grace Christian Academy in Bryson City.

Silence and return
On February 28, 2016, three months and a day after its launch, WTIJ-LP signed off and went silent.  According to a letter written by former station manager Robert Lowe, to the Federal Communications Commission (FCC), the Grace Christian Academy had "chosen to discontinue the service".  Mr. Lowe's position at the station had been "terminated".  At the time the letter was written, there was "no anticipated date to recommence broadcast operations".

On August 8, 2016, WTIJ-LP returned to the air with a Religious and Southern Gospel format.  Local programming previously heard on the station before going silent is no longer broadcast.

Programming
Prior to February 28, 2016, WTIJ-LP carried a Christian-based Full Service format, featuring Positive Country and Southern Gospel music, prior to February 28, 2016.  Local news, weather and agricultural reports were also broadcast.  Live broadcasts of local high school sports, as well as community events, were also heard.  WTIJ-LP had plans to partner with other local organizations in the future.

After August 8, the station broadcasts only nationally syndicated Religious programs and Southern Gospel music, with no locally produced programming.  SRN News continues to be heard at the top of each hour.

References

External links
 WTIJ-LP Online
 

2015 establishments in North Carolina
Radio stations established in 2015
TIJ-LP
TIJ-LP